Charity Island Light is a lighthouse on Big Charity Island in Lake Huron just off the coast of Au Gres, Northern Michigan.

History
In 1838, the region was the source of lumber being removed from Lower Michigan via the rivers that enter the lower end of Saginaw Bay.  The shoals around Charity Island were a major source of problems, posing an obstacle to lumber vessels. It was not until 1856, however, that funds were allocated to establish a light on the island.

The octagonal cast iron lantern displayed a fixed white Fourth Order Fresnel lens light which was constructed in 1857 with a  tower which provided a  range of visibility.  The Lighthouse Board was in the process of constructing a set of lights up and down the coast, and 13 nautical miles was considered adequate both to keep boats off the island and to navigate from one light to the next.

It was originally equipped with a white, Fourth Order Fresnel lens. In 1900, an acetylene lens replaced the 4th order lens. The lights characteristic changed from steady white light to a flashing light, at 10 second intervals. "Charity Island lighthouse was the first on the Great Lakes to receive such a light

The light was fully automated in 1900.

The original lighthouse keeper’s quarters was a wood duplex; attached by a walkway was the tower. In 1917 the site was the first to be automated with an acetylene lamp.

The light was abandoned since 1939 when Gravelly Shoal was lit, and it rapidly fell apart.  It wound up on the Lighthouse Digest "Doomsday List" and required rehabilitation.

The Nature Conservancy is said to own the tower.

Alternatively, another source states that the tower is owned by the U.S. Fish & Wildlife Service and operated by the Arenac County Historical Society.

Present status
The Charity Island Preservation Committee of the Arenac County Historical Society is restoring the tower.  The original keeper's house was razed, and a new restored private residence has been built in its place and on its foundation.  It is being operated as a restaurant and a bed and breakfast.  A full list of past keepers of the light is maintained for historical reference.

Access
It is hard to get close enough to this light to see it.  In this area, Lake Huron is quite shallow and rocky, and the light is too far out to be seen from shore. Getting a boat near it requires a motor, oars or a long paddle, and considerable care.

However, tours of the island (and dinner cruises) are commercially available on vessels named the Catamaran and the North Star.  They include the privately owned and recently rebuilt Charity Island Light Lighthouse keeper's house and a passing view of Gravelly Shoal Light. They are available from Charity Island Transport, Inc. in Au Gres, Michigan, on the mainland, south of Tawas.

See also
Lighthouses in the United States

References

Further reading
Harrison, Tim (editor of Lighthouse Digest and President of the American Lighthouse Foundation), (September, 2009) Ghost Lights of Michigan (Rare historic images and text on Michigan's lost and obscure lighthouse, including bonus chapters on lightships and lighthouse tenders.) East Machias, Maine: Foghorn Publishing, .

External links
 
 Charity Island - Visiting the island
 Interactive map of lighthouses in area by LighthousesRus
 Map of Michigan Lighthouses from Michigan.gov
 Michigan Lighthouse project, Charity Island Light.
 Photos of Charity Island Lighthouse (current) and ferry.
 Terry Pepper, Charity Island Lighthouse, Seeing The Light.
 

Lighthouses completed in 1857
Houses completed in 1857
Buildings and structures in Arenac County, Michigan
Lighthouses in Michigan
Transportation in Arenac County, Michigan
Bed and breakfasts in Michigan
Saginaw Bay
1857 establishments in Michigan